Through the Noise, the first live CD/DVD from Comeback Kid, was released on October 14, 2008. The concert was filmed in Leipzig, Germany on November 23, 2007. It also features an hour-long documentary of the band.

CD track listing

DVD material
'Live In Leipzig' Concert (Track listing above)
'Our Distance' Documentary (67 Min.)
Broadcasting... (Music Video)
Wake The Dead (Original Version) (Music Video)
Wake The Dead (Monster Version) (Music Video)

References

External links
Comeback Kid official website

Comeback Kid albums
2008 video albums